T. G. Sitharam is a civil engineer, professor at IISc Bangalore (on lien), director at IIT Guwahati, and director (Additional charge) at CIT Kokrajhar. He is known for his works in the fields of rock mechanics, rock engineering and geotechnical earthquake engineering. He is an elected fellow of Indian Geotechnical Society, Institution of Engineers (India) and American Society of Civil Engineers.

He is currently serving as the editor-in-chief of Springer Transactions in Civil and Environmental Engineering and several other journals. He is appointed as Chairman of All India Council for Technical Education.

Awards and honors
S.P. Research Award (SAARC) (1998)
Sir C.V. Raman State Award for Young Scientists, Government of Karnataka (2002)
Prof. Gopal Ranjan Research Award (2014)
The Amulya and Vimala Reddy Lecture Award (2014)
IGS Kueckelmann Award (2015)

Selected patents
System and method for fracking of shale rock formation

Selected articles

Books

References

Living people
Indian Institute of Science alumni
University of Waterloo alumni
Academic staff of the Indian Institute of Science
Indian Institute of Technology directors
Indian civil engineers
20th-century Indian engineers
American Society of Civil Engineers
Year of birth missing (living people)